A pigmented spindle cell nevus is a skin condition characterized by a dark brown to black macule or papule, usually less than 6 mm.

It was characterized in 1975.

See also 
 Partial unilateral lentiginosis
 List of cutaneous conditions
 Spitz nevus

References

External links 

Melanocytic nevi and neoplasms